François Moulin (8 August 1959 in Paris – 12 August 2012) was a French journalist and writer.

Selected publications 
Art nouveau, l'épopée lorraine, 1999.
Jean Prouvé, le maître du métal, 2001 (only biography of the French designer, laureate of the national architecture book award).
Le Mangeur lorrain, 2003.
Le procès Simone Weber, 2004.    
Le Peuple du fer, 2006. Prix Victor Hugo.
Ségolène Royal, un destin français, 2007.
Lorraine, années noires, de la collaboration à l'épuration, 2009 (prix Léopold).
  
A specialist in the history of Lorraine, he is also the author of: 
 Lettres de poilus
 Loritz, un lycée pionnier
 Les Enfants de la Grande Guerre
 Les Récits de la Grande Guerre
 L'Est Républicain, chronique d'un quotidien  
 L'épopée du fer : 100 ans de métallurgie en Lorraine 2010 
 Les grandes affaires criminelles des Vosges 2010. 
 Histoire des Lorrains : volume 1 2011.

References

External links 

1959 births
2012 deaths
Writers from Paris
20th-century French journalists
21st-century French journalists
21st-century French writers